The San Francisco Standard is an online news organization based in San Francisco, California. It was funded in part by the billionaire venture capitalist Michael Moritz. The Standard was covered in other media for its coverage of Chesa Boudin's drug prosecution record.

The San Francisco Standard was originally Here/Say Media, a project of Civic Action Labs, a 501(c)4 nonprofit. Some journalism ethicists were concerned about the organization's structure (nearly all nonprofit journalism organizations are 501(c)3 nonprofits) and refusal to disclose its donors. In March 2021, Here/Say disclosed on its website that it was funded by Crankstart, a foundation funded by Michael Moritz and Harriet Heyman. In August 2021, Here/Say wrote that it had incorporated into an independent, for-profit entity, and that Moritz and Heyman had invested $10 million.

In November 2021, Here/Say Media announced that that the organization changed its name to The San Francisco Standard.

In December 2021, the Standard partnered with ABC 7 to cover the 2022 California's 17th State Assembly district special election.

The San Francisco Standard's voter poll was featured in news coverage on the recall election of San Francisco District Attorney Chesa Boudin.

In May 2022, the Standard published a story showing that Boudin's office secured three convictions for drug dealing in 2021, whereas Boudin's predecessor George Gascón oversaw over 90 convictions in 2018. Instead, Boudin's office emphasized convictions for a different crime which would not penalize foreign nationals with deportation or threats to naturalization. The story generated secondary coverage in the National Review, Washington Monthly, Center for Immigration Studies, Courthouse News Service.  The story was criticized by Matt Charnock of The Bold Italic for allegedly misrepresenting facts and contributing to xenophobic rhetoric.

References

External Links 

 San Francisco Standard website
News media in the United States
Companies based in San Francisco